Great Man (French: Un grand patron) is a 1951 French drama film directed by Yves Ciampi and starring Pierre Fresnay, Renée Devillers and Jean-Claude Pascal.

The film's art direction was by René Moulaert.

Cast
 Pierre Fresnay as Le professeur Louis Delage.
 Renée Devillers as Florence Delage  
 Jean-Claude Pascal as L'interne Marcillac  
 Claire Duhamel as Catherine Delage  
 Michel Vadet as Le docteur Larmy 
 Robert Moor as Le professeur Peccavi  
 Claude Nicot as Barby  
 Philippe Mareuil as Georges  
 Ky Duyen as Chang - le majordome  
 Maurice Ronet as François  
 Émile Genevois as L'ami de Gaston  
 Raymond Galle as Un médecin  
 Bernard Hubrenne as Un élève 
 Catherine Romane as Paulette  
 Georgette Talazac as L'infirmière  
 Georgette Anys as Madame Berval  
 Claire Muriel as Une malade  
 Christian Fourcade as Emile  
 Serge Lecointe as Le petit Albert  
 Elisa Lamotte as La dame d'Orléans  
 Nadine Alari as Yvette  
 Madeleine Barbulée as Marie-Laure  
 Marguerite Garcya as Madame Martin  
 Tania Soucault as Jacky 
 Judith Magre
 Perrette Darbon
 Christiane Barry as Jacqueline  
 Pierre Destailles as Gaston Berval  
 Roland Alexandre as Jacques Brulanges 
 Marcel André as Le docteur Charles Tannard 
 Nadine Bellaigue 
 Anne Béranger
 Henri Doublier
 Maguy Horiot
 Frédérique Hébrard
 Julien Maffre as Un malade  
 Dominique Marcas
 Jacques Monod as Le gendarme  
 Bernard Musson as Un assistant du docteur Delage  
 Alain Raffael as Petit rôle  
 Joëlle Robin
 Jean Thielment

References

Bibliography 
 James Monaco. The Encyclopedia of Film. Perigee Books, 1991.

External links 
 

1951 films
French drama films
1951 drama films
1950s French-language films
Films directed by Yves Ciampi
French black-and-white films
Films scored by Joseph Kosma
1950s French films